The Elizabeth Parker hut is an alpine hut located in Yoho National Park near Lake O'Hara in British Columbia. The hut is maintained by the Alpine Club of Canada.

History
The hut was named after the alpinist Elizabeth Parker, one of the founding members of the Alpine Club of Canada.The log cabin style structures were built in 1912 (Wiwaxy Cabin) and 1919 (main hut).

Access
The hut can be reached via Lake O'Hara Road, South off the Trans-Canada highway from a parking area.

Coordinates:  NAD83 11U 545726 5689508

Facilities
The hut sleeps about 24 in summer and 20 in winter.  It is equipped with propane powered lamps, stovetop and oven.

Activities
The hut is used as a base for mountaineering and a starting point for trips to the Abbot Pass hut.

Nearby
 Lake O'Hara
 Abbot Pass
 Mount Victoria
 Mount Lefroy
 Wiwaxy Peak

References

External links
 Elizabeth Parker hut at the Alpine Club of Canada
 Elizabeth Parker hut at bivouac.com

Mountain huts in Canada
Yoho National Park
Buildings and structures in British Columbia